Railway Settlement Roza is a town and a nagar panchayat in Shahjahanpur district in the Indian state of Uttar Pradesh.

Demographics
 India census, Railway Settlement Roza had a population of 10,499. Males constitute 54% of the population and females 46%. Railway Settlement Roza has an average literacy rate of 68%, higher than the national average of 59.5%: male literacy is 75%, and female literacy is 58%. In Railway Settlement Roza, 14% of the population is under 6 years of age.

Transport
 Railway Station
Roza Junction railway station is situated near NH 24, Roza. It serves near by cities like Sitapur, Shahjahanpur, Bareilly etc.

References

Cities and towns in Shahjahanpur district